Ash Atalla (born 18 June 1972) is an Egyptian-born British television producer. He has produced several British TV series such as The Office, The IT Crowd, Man Stroke Woman and People Just Do Nothing. He has also made cameo appearances in productions such as Ricky Gervais's Politics.

Early life
Atalla was born into a middle-class family in Cairo. He developed polio as a baby and uses a wheelchair. He emigrated to London due to his father's job. He read business and finance at the University of Bath. He briefly worked as a stockbroker and a currency trader before, at 22, he found unpaid work on BBC Watchdog.

Career
Atalla made his first appearance on TV in 1999 when he co-presented a Channel 4 series on disability, Freak Out. In 2001, he produced the sitcom The Office. Atalla joined the production company Talkback Thames in 2004 as Head of Comedy and produced both the science spoof Look Around You for BBC2, and the third series of Bo Selecta! In 2005 he devised and began work on Man Stroke Woman, a comedy sketch show about "growing up" which aired from 2005 to 2007. He also produced The IT Crowd (2006-2010).

In 2007, Atalla set up Roughcut TV, an independent production company. Atalla and Roughcut produced Trinity for ITV2 in 2008. Roughcut TV has since produced shows for all the UK's major broadcasters, including Trollied (Sky 1), Cuckoo (BBC Three), World's Craziest Fools - starring Mr. T (BBC Three), Anna & Katy (Channel 4), People Just Do Nothing (BBC Three), Mad Mad World (ITV 1) and Top Coppers (BBC Three). He has also made cameo appearances in productions such as Ricky Gervais' Politics.

See also 
Lists of Egyptians
List of Copts

References

External links 
 Roughcut TV
 
 

1972 births
Living people
British television producers
Egyptian emigrants to the United Kingdom
People with polio
Naturalised citizens of the United Kingdom